Baruntse is a mountain in the Khumbu region of eastern Nepal, crowned by four peaks and bounded on the south by the Hunku Glacier, on the east by the Barun Glacier, and on the northwest by the Imja Glacier. The mountain was first climbed May 30, 1954 via the south ridge by Colin Todd and Geoff Harrow of a New Zealand expedition led by Sir Edmund Hillary.
The first ascent of the East Ridge was made on April 27, 1980 by Lorenzo Ortas, Javier Escartín, Jeronimo Lopez (all Spain) and Carlos Buhler (America) of a Spanish expedition led by Juan José Díaz Ibañez.

Accessing the mountain is usually gained from the South, where climbers can ascend Mera Peak to acclimatise before moving up the valley to Baruntse base camp.

Nineteen-times Everest summiteer Chhewang Nima died in 2010 on Baruntse. after falling through a cornice while fixing a rope beneath the summit.

References

Mountains of Koshi Province
Seven-thousanders of the Himalayas
Solukhumbu District